Atriplex powellii, or Powell's saltweed, is a plant found in the United States and Canada.

Uses
Among the Zuni people, the seeds were eaten raw before the presence of corn and afterwards. They are also ground with corn meal and made into a mush.

References

powellii
Edible nuts and seeds
Plants used in Native American cuisine